Karla Barrera (born 22 February 1984) is a Puerto Rican windsurfer. She competed in the women's Mistral One Design event at the 2004 Summer Olympics.

References

External links
 
 

1984 births
Living people
Puerto Rican windsurfers
Female windsurfers
Puerto Rican female sailors (sport)
Olympic sailors of Puerto Rico
Sailors at the 2004 Summer Olympics – Mistral One Design
Sportspeople from San Juan, Puerto Rico